Sonari Airport , also known as Jamshedpur Airport, is a domestic airport in Jamshedpur, Jharkhand, India, owned by Tata Steel. It is the main airport serving the city of Jamshedpur and adjoining regions. The airport was in commercial operations until 2016, when the operations from the airport was ceased. After efforts taken by the Ministry of Civil Aviation, Government of Jharkhand and Tata Steel, The Directorate General of Civil Aviation (DGCA) granted licence to the airport for public use on 25 January 2023. It reopened for commercial operations between Kolkata & Bhubaneswar from 31 January 2023.

History
The airport was opened in 1940 by the Tata Group and gave the ownership to its subsidiary, Tata Steel. In past years, the airport was served by airlines like Kingfisher Airlines and MDLR Airlines, which discontinued services due to various reasons despite recording good traffic. While MDLR ceased operations due to internal issues, Kingfisher had to discontinue services in November 2009 after load restrictions were imposed due to the short length of the runway. Since Kingfisher operated larger ATR-42 and ATR-72 aircraft respectively, operations became unviable. Scheduled flights were supposed to begin in 2018 under the government's UDAN Scheme, however, this did not take place. After efforts from the Ministry of Civil Aviation, Government of Jharkhand and Tata Steel, the airport has been reopened on 31 January 2023, with flight services provided by the new low-cost regional airline, IndiaOne Air, to Kolkata and Bhubaneswar.

Future

As the airport is too small to handle regular commercial operations and also because of no space for expansion due to its location within the city, the airport will be replaced with a new airport at Dhalbhumgarh, which will be built at an initial investment ₹100 crores. The entire cost for construction of airport will be ₹300 crores which will be completed in two phases. It will be built on a former World War II era airfield. The construction of airport is expected to start once it receives necessary forest clearance from the Forest Department of the State Government, which is still under progress.

Airlines and destinations

Gallery

See also
 Birsa Munda Airport
 Deoghar Airport
 Bokaro Airport
 Dhalbhumgarh Airport
 Chakulia Airport
 List of airports in India
 List of airports in Jharkhand

References

Airports in Jharkhand
Transport in Jamshedpur
Airports established in 1940
1940 establishments in India
20th-century architecture in India